2019 J. League Cup is the 27th J.League Cup, which began on 6 March 2019.

The official title is 2019 J.League YBC Levain Cup (2019 JリーグYBCルヴァンカップ) due to the sponsorship of Yamazaki Baking. The winners would have earned the right to play against the winners of the 2019 Copa Sudamericana in the 2020 J.League Cup / Copa Sudamericana Championship, but it would not held due to the 2020 Tokyo Olympics held at the same time.

Format 
J.League announced the schedule and the matchdays up to the semifinals on December 14, 2018, and full fixture of the matches including the final (on October 26, at Saitama Stadium 2002) on 23 January, 2019.

All 18 teams playing in the 2019 J1 League will participate. In addition, depending on the result of the 2019 AFC Champions League qualifying play-offs, one or two teams from 2019 J2 League with the best performance in the previous season (i.e., Kashiwa Reysol and V-Varen Nagasaki, the 17th- and 18th-placed teams in 2018 J1 League, respectively) may participate.

Group stage 
Participants of 2019 AFC Champions League group stage (ACL) receive byes for the group stage and the play-off stage.

 Kawasaki Frontale and Urawa Red Diamonds received byes for the J.League Cup group stage and play-off stage.
 Sanfrecce Hiroshima and Kashima Antlers will receive byes for the J.League Cup group stage and play-off stage if they win the play-offs of ACL and advance to the ACL group stage. In case either of them advanced to ACL group stage, Kashiwa Reysol will join the J. League Cup group stage. In case both of them advanced to ACL group stage, Kashiwa Reysol and V-Varen Nagasaki will join.

As a result, 16 teams will play the group stage. 16 teams are divided into four groups of four teams by the performance of 2018 J1 League and 2018 J2 League (parenthesized below).

 Group A: Hokkaido Consadole Sapporo (J1 4th), Yokohama F. Marinos (J1 12th), Shonan Bellmare (J1 13th), V-Varen Nagasaki (J1 18th).
 Group B: FC Tokyo (J1 6th), Vegalta Sendai (J1 11th), Sagan Tosu (J1 14th), Kashiwa Reysol (J1 17th).
 Group C: Cerezo Osaka (J1 7th), Vissel Kobe (J1 10th), Nagoya Grampus (J1 15th), Oita Trinita (J2 2nd).
 Group D: Shimizu S-Pulse (J1 8th), Gamba Osaka (J1 9th), Júbilo Iwata (J1 16th), Matsumoto Yamaga FC (J2 1st)
 These groups are the cases when both Hiroshima and Kashima advance to the ACL group stage. In case either or both teams cannot advance to the ACL group stage, they will replace the spot for Nagasaki and/or Kashiwa (other matchups are not replaced).

Each group is played on a home-and-away round-robin basis. Each match will be played for 90 minutes (without extra time).

Group stage tiebreakers 
In the group stage, teams in a group are ranked by points (3 points for a win, 1 point for a draw, 0 points for a loss). If the points are tied, the following tiebreakers are applied:

 Points in head-to-head matches among tied teams;
 Goal difference in head-to-head matches among tied teams;
 Goals scored in head-to-head matches among tied teams;
 Away goals scored in head-to-head matches among tied teams;
 If more than two teams are tied, and applying all head-to-head criteria above remains a part of teams still tied, reapply the criteria above only for the tied teams.
 Goal difference in all group matches;
 Goals scored in all group matches;
 Penalty shoot-out if only two teams are tied and they met in the last round of the group;
 Fewer disciplinary points;
 Drawing of lots.

In case of ranking third-placed teams across the groups, the following criteria are used:

 Points;
 Goal difference in all group matches;
 Goals scored in all group matches;
 Fewer disciplinary points;
 Drawing of lots.

Play-off stage 
The number of play-off stage participants depends on the number of teams advanced to ACL group stage.

 In case four teams advanced to ACL group stage, eight teams (top two teams in each group) will play the play-off.
 In case three teams advanced to ACL group stage, ten teams (top two teams in each group, and two best third-placed teams across the groups) will play the play-off.
 In case two teams advanced to ACL group stage, twelve teams (top three teams in each group) will play the play-off.

The play-off stage is played as two-legged ties of two teams each. The away goals rule, an extra time (away goals rule is not applied for the scores in the extra time), and a penalty shoot-out are used if needed.

Prime stage (Knockout stage) 
The prime stage (knockout stage) is played by 8 teams who advanced to ACL group stage and won the play-off stage.

The quarterfinals and the semifinals are played as two-legged ties (same as the play-off stage). The final is a single game.

The video assistant referee (VAR) system will be used during the knockout stage.
 Due to the difficulty in logistics of the video system by typhoon Hagibis, the use of VAR was cancelled for the match of Kashima Antlers v Kawasaki Frontale (13 October, semifinal second leg), and additional assistant referees are introduced instead.

Schedule 
The schedule, except for the final, was announced on 14 December 2018. All matches of the group stage and the play-off stage will be played on Wednesdays.

Group stage

Group A

Group B

Group C

Group D

Play-off stage 

Source: J. League data site

Prime stage (Knockout stage) 
The draw for the prime stage was held on July 28 at Fuji TV Odaiba headquarters, Tokyo.

For each tie in the bracket (except the final), the team on top will play the second leg at home.

Quarter-finals
F.C. Tokyo played their home match on NACK5 Stadium Omiya instead of their regular home stadium Ajinomoto Stadium.

Source: J. League data site

Semi-finals

Source: J. League data site

Final

Footnotes

Notes

References

Related articles 
 2019 J1 League
 2019 Emperor's Cup
 2019 AFC Champions League

External links 

J.League Cup
2019 in Japanese football